The University of Dallas is a private Catholic university in Irving, Texas. Established in 1956, it is accredited by the Southern Association of Colleges and Schools.

The university comprises four academic units: the Braniff Graduate School of Liberal Arts, the Constantin College of Liberal Arts, the Satish & Yasmin Gupta College of Business, and the School of Ministry. Dallas offers several master's degree programs and a doctoral degree program with three concentrations. As of 2017, there are 136 full-time faculty and 102 part-time faculty.

History
The University of Dallas' charter dates from 1910 when the Western Province of the Congregation of the Mission (Vincentians) renamed Holy Trinity College in Dallas, which they had founded in 1905. The provincial of the Western Province closed the university in 1928, and the charter reverted to the Diocese of Dallas. In 1955, the Western Province of the Sisters of Saint Mary of Namur obtained it to create a new higher education institution in Dallas that would subsume their junior college, Our Lady of Victory College, located in Fort Worth. The sisters, together with Eugene Constantin Jr. and Edward R. Maher Sr., petitioned the Diocese of Dallas to sponsor the university, though ownership was entrusted to a self-perpetuating independent board of trustees.

The University character was defined from its first day as being quite unlike the other Catholic universities of Texas and in fact unlike most Catholic colleges nationwide because of the understanding in Bishop Gorman of what a great University was supposed to be.  This understanding came in great part from his own education in Europe between the wars at the Louvain, the Catholic University in Belgium often thought to be the greatest Catholic University in the world.

"Bishop Gorman, as chancellor of the new university, announced that it would be a Catholic coeducational institution welcoming students of all faiths and races and offering work on the undergraduate level, with a graduate school to be added as soon as possible. The new University of Dallas opened to ninety-six students in September 1956 on a 1,000-acre tract of rolling hills northwest of Dallas."

The Sisters of Saint Mary of Namur, monks from the Order of Cistercians (Cistercians), friars from the Order of Friars Minor (Franciscans), and several lay professors formed the university's original faculty. The Franciscans departed three years later; however, friars from the Order of Preachers (Dominicans) joined the faculty in 1958 and built St. Albert the Great Priory on campus. The Cistercians established Our Lady of Dallas Abbey in 1958 and Cistercian Preparatory School in 1962, which are both adjacent to campus. The School Sisters of Notre Dame arrived in 1962 and opened the Notre Dame Special School for children with learning difficulties in 1963 and a motherhouse for the Dallas Province in 1964, which were both on campus. The sisters moved the school to Dallas in 1985 and closed the motherhouse in 1987. The faculty now is almost exclusively lay and includes several distinguished scholars.

A grant from the Blakley-Braniff Foundation established the Braniff Graduate School in 1966 and allowed the construction of the Braniff Graduate Center. The Constantin Foundation similarly endowed the undergraduate college, and, in 1970, the Board of Trustees named the undergraduate college the Constantin College of Liberal Arts. The Graduate School of Management, begun in 1966, offers a large MBA program. Programs in art and English also began in 1966. In 1973, the Institute of Philosophic Studies, the doctoral program of the Braniff Graduate School and an outgrowth of the Kendall Politics and Literature Program, was initiated. The School of Ministry began in 1987. The College of Business, incorporating the Gupta Graduate School of Management and undergraduate business, opened in 2003.

Since the first class in 1960, university graduates have won significant honors, including 39 Fulbright awards.

Accreditation by the Southern Association of Colleges and Schools came in 1963 and has been reaffirmed regularly. In 1989, it was the youngest higher education institution to ever be awarded a Phi Beta Kappa chapter.

In 2015 the university applied for an exception to Title IX allowing it to discriminate based on gender identity for religious reasons. The university "cannot encourage individuals to live in conflict with Catholic principles" according to president Thomas Keefe. In 2016 the organization Campus Pride ranked the college among the worst schools in Texas for LGBT students.

The university briefly considered a large expansion into adult education in 2017.  That idea proved unpopular with many faculty and was shelved.

President Thomas W. Keefe was hired from Benedictine University to serve as president.  Like his predecessors, he quickly ran into controversy as he oversaw efforts to adapt the way the University operates to those associated with more conventional American Catholic colleges and universities.  In 2017, Keefe's leadership was strongly and publicly challenged by over half the faculty and thousands of alumni members of an independent alumni group called UD Alumni for Liberal Education.  Their complaint was over a proposal to add a new college within the university that it was believed would have watered down standards. After almost nonstop controversy and multiple efforts by Trustees to rein in the controversies, on Good Friday of 2018, after an extended and unexplained absence from work, the university's trustees voted to fire Keefe as university president effective at the end of the academic year.

The Role of the Cistercians 

Bishop Thomas Gorman wrote as early as 1954 to Fr. Anselm Nagy, O. Cist. to ask the displaced Hungarian Cistercian fathers from the Monastery of Zirc, Hungary to come assist in founding the university. On the first day of classes in September 1956, 9 Cistercian fathers, half the entire faculty, were employed at the new university. The history of UD is connected to both those founding Cistercian priests and the many more Hungarians who would move to Dallas over the next decade and begin teaching at UD.

Guadalupe art print scandal 
On February 14, 2008, an image of Our Lady of Guadalupe was removed without permission from the Upper Gallery of the Haggerty Art Village. The image, entitled "Saint or Sinner", was on loan from Murray State University in Kentucky as part of a larger exhibit of works by Murray State University students. The piece reportedly portrayed the Virgin Mary as a stripper. Immediate responses to the piece by students when it went on display were largely negative; to appease concerns, signage was put up warning students that "some items [on display] might be considered offensive." The university's president, Frank Lazarus, publicly condemned the theft. Reaction to Dr. Lazarus' statement prompted heated campus discussion and faced negative reception from online Catholic and conservative tabloids.

Governance and leadership

As of 2022, the President is Jonathan J. Sanford, an American philosopher who previously served as the school's provost.

The University of Dallas is governed by a board of trustees. According to the university's by-laws, the Bishop of Dallas is an ex-officio voting member.

Edward Burns, Bishop of the Diocese of Dallas, currently serves as the chancellor. The office, held by a Catholic bishop per the constitution of the university, is an unpaid, honorary position.

Previous chancellors include:
Thomas Kiely Gorman (1954–1969)
Thomas Ambrose Tschoepe (1969–1990)
Charles Victor Grahmann (1990–2007)
Kevin J. Farrell (2008-2016)

Previous presidents include:
F. Kenneth Brasted (1956–1959)
Robert J. Morris (1960–1962)
Donald A. Cowan (1962–1977)
John R. Sommerfeldt (1978–1980)
Robert F. Sasseen (1981–1995)
Milam J. Joseph (1996–2003)
Frank Lazarus (2004–2010)
Thomas Keefe (2010-2018)
Thomas S. Hibbs (2019–2021)

Campus

The university is located in Irving, Texas, on a 744-acre (301 hectare) campus in the Dallas–Fort Worth metroplex. The Las Colinas development is nearby. It is 10 miles (16 km) from downtown Dallas. The campus consists mostly of mid-century modernist, earth-toned brick buildings set amidst the native Texas landscape. Several of these buildings were designed by the well-known Texas architect O'Neil Ford (dubbed the Godfather of Texas modernism). The mall is the center of campus, with the 187.5 feet tall (57.15 meters) Braniff Memorial Tower as its focal point.

Perhaps reflecting prevailing biases against mid-century modern architecture, The Princeton Review once mentioned the University of Dallas as having the fourth-least beautiful campus among the America's top colleges and universities, along with several other campuses with abundant modern architecture. Travel + Leisures October 2013 issue lists it as one of America's ugliest college campuses, citing its "low-profile, boxy architecture that bears uncanny resemblance to a public car park", but noting that a recent $12 million donation from alumni Satish and Yasmin Gupta would bring new campus construction.

A Dallas Area Rapid Transit (DART) Orange Line light-rail station opened near campus on July 30, 2012.

The campus is home to the Orpheion Theatre, a small Greek-style playing space built into a hillside. The theatre was constructed in 2003, and has since been used for a handful of mainstage and student productions.

Enrollment
Undergraduate
1,471 students
44% in-state; 55% out-of-state; 1% international
98% full-time
56% female; 44% male
99% age 24 and under
78% Catholic
27% minority

The 2019–2020 estimated charges, including tuition, room, board, and fees, for full-time undergraduates is $59,600. This is an increase from the 2016–2017 academic year of $54,976.

81% of freshmen who began their degree programs in Fall 2014 returned as sophomores in Fall 2015.  66% of freshmen who began their degree programs in Fall 2009 graduated within 4-years.

Graduate
1,071 students
31% full-time
38% Catholic

Academics

Core curriculum and traditional liberal education
The university has resisted a focus on "trades and job training" and pursued the traditional ideas of a liberal education according to the model described by John Henry Newman in The Idea of a University. The university's "Core Curriculum" is a collection of approximately twenty courses (two years) of common study covering philosophy, theology, history, literature, politics, economics, mathematics, science, art, and a foreign language. The curriculum not only includes a slate of required courses, but includes specific standardized texts, which permit professors to assume a common body of knowledge and speak across disciplines.  Classes in these core subjects typically have an average class size of 16 students to permit frequent discussion.  Dallas is one of 25 schools graded "A" by the American Council of Trustees and Alumni for a solid core curriculum.

There is a similar Core Curriculum for graduate studies in the Braniff Graduate School of Liberal Arts.

Undergraduate
Undergraduate students are enrolled in the Constantin College of Liberal Arts, the Satish & Yasmin Gupta College of Business, or the Ann & Joe O. Neuhoff School of Ministry. The university awards Bachelor of Arts (BA) and Bachelor of Science (BS) degrees.

UD offers a five-year dual degree program in Electrical Engineering, in collaboration with The University of Texas at Arlington.

In 1970, the university started a study abroad program in which Dallas students, generally sophomores, spend a semester at its campus southeast of Rome in the Alban Hills along the Via Appia Nuova. In June 1994, the property was renovated and renamed the Eugene Constantin Rome Campus. It includes a library, a chapel, housing, a dining hall, classrooms, a tennis court, a bocce court, a swimming pool, an outdoor Greco-Roman theater, vineyards, and olive groves.

Graduate programs

The Braniff Graduate School of Liberal Arts administers master's degrees in American studies, art, English, humanities, philosophy, politics, psychology, and theology, as well as an interdisciplinary doctoral program with concentrations in English, philosophy, and politics.

The Satish and Yasmin Gupta College of Business is an AACSB-accredited business school offering a part-time MBA program for working professionals, a Master of Science program, a Doctor of Business Administration (DBA), Graduate Certificates, graduate preparatory programs, and professional development courses.

The Ann & Joe O. Neuhoff School of Ministry offers master's degrees in Theological Studies (MTS), Religious Education (MRE), Catholic School Leadership (MCSL), Catholic School Teaching (MCST), and Pastoral Ministry (MPM).  The University of Dallas School of Ministry offers a comprehensive, four-year Catholic Biblical School (CBS) certification program. This program, which covers every book of the Bible, is offered onsite and online in both English and Spanish.

Rankings

Undergraduate
Ranked No. 9 in the nation as the least LGBT friendly by Princeton Review in 2017 and 15th in 2018
Ranked No. 12 among Western regional universities by U.S. News & World Report (2022 edition).
Ranked No. 15 among master's universities by The Washington Monthly (2015 edition).
Ranked No. 64 among Western regional universities on the Webometrics Ranking of World Universities (2012 edition).
Ranked No. 225 on Forbes list of America's Best Colleges (2019 edition).
Listed as one of the 126 best colleges in the Western United States by The Princeton Review.
Earned an A-grade on the 2011 "What Will They Learn?" project of the American Council of Trustees and Alumni.
Endorsed by the Cardinal Newman Society, a conservative Catholic association. (Twenty schools in the US received such an endorsement).
 A 1998 book of conservative college recommendations, Choosing the Right College, strongly endorsed the University of Dallas.

Graduate
The Department of Art was ranked No. 191 by the U.S. News & World Report's Best Graduate School Rankings 2016.
The 2010 National Research Council Assessment of Research-Doctorate Programs in the US ranked the University of Dallas' doctoral concentrations at or near the bottom (survey-based quality score) of those surveyed in the US:  English: 116-119/119; philosophy: 76-89/90; politics: 100-105/105.
A 2010 survey of political theory professors published in the journal Political Science & Politics ranked the doctoral concentration in politics 29th out of 106-surveyed programs in the US specializing in political theory.

Research
The on-campus editorial offices of Dallas Medieval Texts and Translations have been publishing a book series of medieval Latin texts with facing English translations. The goal of the series is to build a library that will represent the whole breadth and variety of medieval civilization. The series is open-ended; as of May, 2016, it has published 21 volumes.

Haggerty Art Village

The Braniff Graduate School of Liberal Arts features a small, graduate art program, located in Haggerty Art Village. Haggerty Art Village is separated from the rest of campus by a wooded grove, and the social atmosphere around the village is considerably different from the rest of the university.

Haggerty Art Village itself features printmaking, painting, sculpture, and ceramics facilities, though graduate students are not bound to a single medium, and receive their degree as a broader "art" classification. The program is small, with only 16 graduate art students.

The University's gallery is named after Beatrice Haggerty who helped form the Art Village. Haggerty's involvement with the art program came after her daughter Kathleen was seriously injured in an auto accident. The Haggerty gift of the first art building in 1960 was engineered for her therapy.  Haggerty suggested to her husband Patrick E. Haggerty that the new university could benefit by a small building for sculpture. In return, their daughter had access to the needed therapeutic work.  Beatrice Haggerty simultaneously cultivated partnerships and future opportunity for the university's art program to flourish. After the completion of the Patrick and Beatrice Haggerty Museum of Art in Wisconsin, Haggerty again donated to fund the building of the first art building at the University of Dallas in 1960. It is currently one of six structures that make up the Haggerty Art Village.

In 1994 a fundraising campaign was launched for the completion of more buildings to change the existing structures into a proper village.  The funds would renovate the older art buildings, add a multipurpose art history building, a new sculpture facility, and an art foundations building.

Media
The student newspaper is The University News, published weekly on Wednesdays both in-print and online. The yearbook, first published in 1957, is The Crusader. Ramify, the official journal of the Braniff Graduate School of Liberal Arts, has been published since 2009. OnStage Magazine has been operated by the Drama Department since 2016. The Mockingbird, a student-ran and student-funded publication, began monthly printing in September 2020. Since 2011, the Phi Beta Kappa liberal arts honor society has published the University Scholar once a semester to showcase essays, short stories, poems, and scientific abstracts of the university's undergraduates.

The Office of Advancement publishes Tower Magazine for alumni on a twice yearly basis, usually in Summer and in Winter.

Residence life
On campus residency is required of all students who have not yet attained senior status or who are under 21 and are not married, not a veteran of the military, or who do not live with their parents or relatives in the Dallas–Fort Worth area. These requirements change from year to year depending upon the size of the incoming freshman class; for instance, in 2009, all students with senior credit standing were required to live off campus. Freshmen live in traditional single-sex halls, while upperclassmen live either in the University's co-ed dormitory or off-campus.

There are five traditional halls for freshmen students. Jerome, Augustine and Gregory halls are all-female halls. These halls were last renovated in 1998, 1995, and 2014 respectively. Theresa and Madonna halls are all-male halls. These halls were renovated in 2000 and 1999 respectively. Clark Hall is the only co-ed dormitory and was built in 2010. The final hall is O'Connell Hall. Renovated in 2010, O'Connell Hall housing is based upon campus population housing needs for any given year. This hall may house new students, continuing students or a combination of both by floor if necessary.

Tuition
The cost of attendance for the University of Dallas is dependent on the student's commuter status. For an on-campus student, the cost of attendance for the 2019–2020 school year is $59,600. For an off-campus resident in Texas, the cost of attendance for the 2019–2020 school year is $55,640. For a student living with parents or relatives, the cost of attendance for the 2019–2020 school year is $51,340.

Criticism

The University of Dallas was criticized for a 2015 commencement ceremony in which speaker L. Brent Bozell III attributed the "destruction of the family" to gay marriage, saying that paganism and gay acceptance constituted anti-Christian bigotry taking over America. The Princeton Review ranked the university as the 15th most LGBT-unfriendly school in the United States.

Notable people

Alumni

Notable alumni include:

Intellectuals, artists and entertainers
Larry Arnhart - Political theorist
Jeffrey Bishop - Philosopher, physician and bioethicist (Director of the Albert Gnaegi Center for Health Care Ethics) at St. Louis University
L. Brent Bozell III - Founder of Media Research Center and Fox News political commentator
L. M. Kit Carson - Actor and screenwriter
Elizabeth (Betsy) DiSalvo, née James - Scholar in interactive computing and learning sciences and professor at Georgia Institute of Technology.
John C. Eastman - Constitutional law scholar and Reagan Administration official
Joe G. N. Garcia - Pulmonary scientist, medical researcher, academic administrator (at Johns Hopkins University) and physician
Henry Godinez - Scholar of Latino theater at Northwestern University
Lara Grice - American film actress known for The Mechanic (2011), The Final Destination (2009) and Déjà Vu
Ernie Hawkins - Blues guitarist and singer
Jason Henderson - Best-selling fantasy novelist and comic book author
Thomas S. Hibbs - Philosopher and Honors College Dean at Baylor University, former President 
Andy Hummel - Bassist and songwriter for power-pop band Big Star
Emily Jacir - Palestinian-American artist and activist
Anita Jose - Professor, business strategist, essayist
Joseph Patrick Kelly - Literary scholar focused on the works of James Joyce
Peter MacNicol - Actor, notable performances include Ghostbusters, Ally McBeal, and Fox's 24
Patrick Madrid – Author, radio host and Catholic commentator
William Marshner - Ethicist and theologian
John McCaa - American television journalist
Eric McLuhan - media theorist and son of Marshall McLuhan
Trish Murphy - Singer-songwriter
Carl Olson - American journalist and Catholic writer
Mackubin Thomas Owens - assistant dean of academics for Electives, Naval War College
Tan Parker - Texas State Representative from Flower Mound and businessman
Margot Roosevelt (attended, did not graduate) - American journalist at Orange County Register
Gary Schmitt - public intellectual and co-founder of the Project for the New American Century
Daryush Shokof - artist "Maximalism", Filmmaker "Amenic Film", Philosopher "Yekishim"
Christopher Evan Welch - American actor famous for playing Peter Gregory in the HBO series Silicon Valley
Gene Wolande - actor (L.A. Confidential) and television writer (The Wonder Years)
Brantly Womack - professor of government and foreign affairs, University of Virginia

Business, politics and public affairs
Miriem Bensalah-Chaqroun - Moroccan businesswoman and president of Confédération générale des entreprises du Maroc from 2012 to 2018
Robert Bunda - Hawaiian politician
Suren Dutia - Business executive and entrepreneurship expert at Kauffman Foundation
Emmet Flood - Special Counsel to President George W. Bush, 2007–2008
John H. Gibson - Senior Defense Department official and business executive 
Tadashi Inuzuka - Japanese politician and diplomat
Katherine, Crown Princess of Yugoslavia - Wife of Alexander, Crown Prince of Yugoslavia
Michael Neeb - CEO at HCA Healthcare UK
Rosemary Odinga - Kenyan entrepreneur and activist
Susan Orr Traffas - Former Head of the United States Children's Bureau

Religious leaders
Oscar Cantú - Bishop of San Jose 
Michael Duca - Bishop of Baton Rouge
Daniel E. Flores - Bishop of Brownsville
David Konderla - Bishop of the Diocese of Tulsa
Shawn McKnight - Bishop of Jefferson City
Mark J. Seitz - Bishop of El Paso

Athletes
Mike McPhee - NHL player and investment banker
Tom Rafferty - Professional football player (offensive lineman for the Dallas Cowboys)

Faculty
The university's full-time, permanent faculty have included the following scholars:
Mel Bradford - literary scholar and traditional conservative political theorist
John Alexander Carroll- American historian and co-winner of the 1958 Pulitzer Prize for Biography or Autobiography for George Washington, Volumes I-VII
Louise Cowan - literary critic, English professor and public intellectual
Eugene Curtsinger - professor of English, novelist and academic administrator
Willmoore Kendall - political theorist (mentor of William F. Buckley while teaching at Yale University)
Thomas Lindsay - Texas Public Policy Foundation, Center for Higher Education
Taylor Marshall - traditionalist Catholic writer, former Anglican priest, and one time philosophy professor
Wilfred M. McClay - Intellectual historian and public intellectual
Joshua Parens - Philosopher concentrating on Islamic and Jewish medieval philosophy
Philipp Rosemann - German philosopher specializing in continental and medieval philosophy
Robert Skeris - American theologian and pioneering enthno-musicologist
Janet E. Smith - classicist and philosopher
Gerard Wegemer - literary scholar and the Director for The Center for Thomas More Studies
Thomas G. West - political theorist 
Frederick Wilhelmsen - philosopher

Notable visiting or part-time faculty have included:
Rudolph Gerken - former Archbishop of Santa Fe
Caroline Gordon - American novelist and literary critic
Magnus L. Kpakol - Chief Economic Advisor to the President of Nigeria
Marshall McLuhan - Media theorist and philosopher (coined the expression "the medium is the message" )
Bernard Orchard - British Biblical scholar and Benedictine monk
Mitch Pacwa - American theologian and host of several shows on EWTN
John Marini - political scientist studying American legislative and administrative politics
Mark J. Seitz - Bishop of El Paso
Jeffrey N. Steenson- prelate who converted to Catholicism from Anglicanism

References

Further reading
 University of Dallas: 50 Years of Vision & Courage, 1956–2006 (Irving, Tex.: University of Dallas, 2006). . 165 pp.
 The University of Dallas honoring William A. Blakley (Irving, Tex.: University of Dallas, 1966). 19 pp.

External links

 
 University of Dallas Athletics website
 The University News – student newspaper

 
Buildings and structures in Irving, Texas
Education in Irving, Texas
Educational institutions established in 1956
Universities and colleges accredited by the Southern Association of Colleges and Schools
Universities and colleges in Dallas County, Texas
Universities and colleges in the Dallas–Fort Worth metroplex
USCAA member institutions
Catholic universities and colleges in Texas
Association of Catholic Colleges and Universities
1956 establishments in Texas